Evimantius is a genus of beetles in the family Buprestidae, containing the following species:

 Evimantius curvicollis Kerremans, 1891
 Evimantius rufopictus Deyrolle, 1864

References

Buprestidae genera